"Ego" is a song by the French singer and producer Willy William. It was released on 24 September 2015 through Play On and Warner Music. It has 938 million views on YouTube as of January 2023.

Charts

Weekly charts

Year-end charts

Certifications

References

2015 singles
2015 songs
Willy William songs